Solanum pinnatisectum, the tansy-leaf nightshade or tansyleaf nightshade, is a species of flowering plant in the family Solanaceae, native to Arizona in the United States, and to Mexico. A wild potato, it is being extensively studied for its resistance to Phytophthora infestans (the cause of late potato blight), in an effort to improve the domestic potato Solanum tuberosum.

References

pinnatisectum
Flora of Arizona
Flora of Northeastern Mexico
Flora of Central Mexico
Flora of Southwestern Mexico
Plants described in 1852